The Pill Gallery is a contemporary art gallery based in the historical peninsula of Istanbul, Turkey. It was founded and is directed by Suela J. Cennet, operating as a platform that brings together local and international artists.

History
The Pill was founded in January 2016 by Suela J. Cennet who had previously worked with Daniel Templon in Paris and Brussels. Its inaugural exhibition was a solo presentation by French artist Daniel Firman, followed by a solo presentation by Eva Nielsen.

Since its opening, the gallery has established itself as one of the "most influential" players in the region and a "reference to discover the emerging artistic scene". It was featured in the Istanbul City guides published by Phaidon for Wallpaper as well as Louis Vuitton as one of the most cutting-edge galleries in the city.

The Pill was among the institutional partners of Bourse Emerige Révélations in 2017 and 2018, a prize and long-term support mechanism for emerging French artists. It has participated in leading international art fairs such as ARCO Madrid, Material Art Fair Mexico City, Expo Chicago, Untitled Miami, 1:54 New York, Art-O-Rama Marseille, Paris Photo, FIAC Paris and Contemporary Istanbul. The Pill's art fair participation has been awarded multiple times, winning the Opening Award for best stand at ARCO Madrid 2021 and Best Booth Design Award for Contemporary Istanbul in 2016. Its participation at Future Fair 2021, New York, was deemed "standout" by multiple reviews.

Artists
The following artists have been exhibited at the gallery:

 Soufiane Ababri
 Ozlem Altin
 Mireille Blanc
 Pablo Davilá
 Berke Doganoglu
 Elif Erkan
 Louis Gary
 Leyla Gediz
 Irem Günaydin
 Eva Nielsen
 Elsa Sahal
 Ugo Schiavi
 Apolonia Sokol
 Marion Verboom

References

External links
 Official website

2016 establishments in Turkey
Art galleries established in 2016
Contemporary art galleries in Turkey
Art museums and galleries in Istanbul